The Wills Wing Ultra Sport (sometimes UltraSport) is an American high-wing, single-place, hang glider that was designed and produced by Wills Wing of Santa Ana, California, introduced in 1996. Now out of production, when it was available the aircraft was supplied complete and ready-to-fly.

Design and development
The Ultra Sport was conceived as a recreational glider, capable of making cross country flights. It  is made from aluminum tubing, with the double-surface wing covered in Dacron sailcloth.

The three models are each named for their wing area in square feet.

Variants
Ultra Sport 135
Small-sized model for lighter pilots. Its  span wing is cable braced from a single kingpost. The glider model was HGMA certified in 1998.
Ultra Sport 147
Mid-sized model for medium-weight pilots. Its  span wing is cable braced from a single kingpost. The glider model was HGMA certified in 1996 and is also DHV2 certified.
Ultra Sport 166
Large-sized model for heavier pilots. Its  span wing is cable braced from a single kingpost. The glider model was HGMA certified in 1997 and is also DHV2 certified.

Specifications (Ultra Sport 147)

References

External links
Photo of an Ultra Sport
Official Ultra Sport Owner's Manual

Ultra Sport
Hang gliders